The England women's cricket team toured Ireland in August 1990. They played Ireland in two One Day Internationals, both of which were won by England.

Squads

WODI Series

1st ODI

2nd ODI

References

External links
England Women v Ireland Women ODI Series 1990 from Cricinfo

England women's cricket team tours
Women's international cricket tours of Ireland
1990 in women's cricket